Carlos Angel Dalurzo (born 9 April 1953) is an Argentine middle-distance runner. He competed in the men's 800 metres at the 1972 Summer Olympics.

References

1953 births
Living people
Athletes (track and field) at the 1972 Summer Olympics
Argentine male middle-distance runners
Olympic athletes of Argentina
Place of birth missing (living people)